Reclassification is the changing of an object or concept from one classification to another. This may refer to:
Reclassification (accounting)
Reclassification (education), changing a student's high school (secondary school) graduation class
U.S. reclassification program
Cannabis (reclassification)
Net reclassification improvement